Cúllar is a municipality located in the province of Granada, Spain. According to the 2005 census (INE), the city has a population of 4898 inhabitants. The linguist Gregorio Salvador Caja is one of its most famous personalities.

References

Municipalities in the Province of Granada